Ben Turok (26 June 1927 – 9 December 2019) was an anti-apartheid activist, Economics Professor and a South African member of parliament as a member of the African National Congress.

Biography
Turok was born to poor working-class Jewish parents in Byelorussia in 1927, who were radicalized by the secular Jewish socialist Bundist movement;  his parents migrated to Libau, Latvia when his father became involved in the Jewish labor movement. Later, seeking safety, Turok's father moved the family to the then Union of South Africa in 1934. He graduated from the University of Cape Town in 1950. Returning to South Africa in 1953, he joined the South African Congress of Democrats and in 1955 became its secretary for the Cape western region, acting as a full-time organizer for the Congress of the People. He was the African representative on the Cape Provincial Council.

Turok was the father of Fred Turok, Ivan Turok and Neil Turok, a cosmologist, and founder of the African Institute for Mathematical Sciences in Muizenberg, South Africa. Turok was instrumental in helping draw up the Freedom Charter and also served time in jail under apartheid. Ben died on the morning of 9 December 2019. He was 92 years old.

References

External links
 Ben Turok's Personal website
 South Africa: Overcoming Apartheid - Building Democracy See a 56 min video interview of Ben Turok in 2006 recounting his participation in the struggle against apartheid and other topics, e.g. religion and the struggle.
 South Africa: Overcoming Apartheid - Building Democracy 
 Read a brief biography of Ben Turok from South African History Online
 Archives of Ben Turok at the University of London

1927 births
2019 deaths
Latvian emigrants to South Africa
South African academics
20th-century South African economists
University of Cape Town alumni
Academics of the Open University
People acquitted of treason
African National Congress politicians
Members of the National Assembly of South Africa
South African prisoners and detainees
Prisoners and detainees of South Africa
White South African anti-apartheid activists
Jewish South African anti-apartheid activists